Paul Achille‐Ariel Baize (11 March 1901 – 6 October 1995)  was a French pediatrician and amateur astronomer specialising in double star observations.

He started with his observations of double stars in 1925. Between 1933 and 1971 he was allowed to observe from the Paris Observatory. He made 20,044 measures over 47 years. Since 1954 he often published at the International Astronomical Union Commission 26 Information Circular, the last contribution sending in 1993, when he was 92 years old.

In 1989 he received the Amateur Achievement Award of the Astronomical Society of the Pacific. The asteroid 1591 Baize was named in his honour.

References

External links
French astronomers, visual double stars and the double stars working group of the Société Astronomique de France
IAU Commission 26 Information Circular No. 121
The Colours of Double Stars
Amateur Achievement Award winners

20th-century French astronomers
Amateur astronomers
1901 births
1995 deaths
Place of birth missing
Place of death missing